The 2010–11 Armenian Hockey League season was the tenth season of the Armenian Hockey League. Urartu Yerevan won the league for the fifth consecutive year.

External links
2011 champions on iihf.com

Armenian Hockey League
Armenian Hockey League seasons
2010 in Armenian sport
2011 in Armenian sport